"The Adventure of the Blue Carbuncle" is one of 56 short Sherlock Holmes stories written by Sir Arthur Conan Doyle, the seventh story of twelve in the collection The Adventures of Sherlock Holmes. It was first published in The Strand Magazine in January 1892.

Plot
As London prepares for Christmas, newspapers report the theft of a near-priceless gemstone, the "Blue Carbuncle", from the hotel suite of the Countess of Morcar. The police arrest John Horner, a plumber with a criminal record who was in Countess's room repairing a fireplace grate.

In Baker Street, Watson finds Holmes contemplating a battered old hat brought to him by Peterson, a commissionaire, who seeks Holmes's help in returning the hat to its rightful owner, along with a Christmas goose. Both had been dropped in the street during a scuffle. Although the goose bears a tag with the name Henry Baker, there is little hope of finding an owner with such a common name. Peterson takes the goose home for dinner, and Holmes keeps the hat to study as an intellectual exercise.

Peterson returns excited, carrying the stolen gem, and reports that he found it in the goose's crop. Holmes closely studies the hat and its condition, deducing Henry Baker's age, social standing, intellect, and domestic status. When Baker appears in response to advertisements that Holmes places in the London newspapers, Holmes offers him a new goose. Happily accepting the replacement bird, Baker declines to take away the original bird's entrails, convincing Holmes that he knew nothing about the gem. He tells Holmes that he had purchased the goose at the Alpha Inn, a pub near the British Museum.

Holmes and Watson visit the pub, where the proprietor informs them that the bird was purchased from a Covent Garden dealer. The dealer there refuses to help, complaining of the pestering he has endured recently about geese purchased by the Alpha Inn. Holmes, realising that he is not the only one aware of the goose's importance, tricks the irate man into revealing that the bird was supplied to him by its breeder, Mrs Oakshott of Brixton. A trip to Brixton proves unnecessary when the dealer's other "pesterer" appears – James Ryder, head attendant at the hotel where the gem was stolen.

Back in Baker Street, Ryder admits that he and his accomplice, the Countess's maid, had contrived to frame Horner, believing that his criminal past would make him an easy scapegoat. During a visit to his sister – Mrs Oakshott – Ryder had hit on the idea of feeding the gem to a goose she had promised him as a gift. Unfortunately, Ryder then took away the wrong bird, confusing his goose with another in the flock. By the time he realised his mistake, the other had already been sold.

Ryder sobs convulsively. Holmes takes pity on the man and allows him to flee England, having concluded that he has been far too frightened by the episode to offend again. Also, it was the season of forgiveness. Horner can expect to be freed as the case against him must now collapse.

Publication history
"The Adventure of the Blue Carbuncle" was first published with eight illustrations by Sidney Paget in The Strand Magazine in January 1892, and in the US edition of the Strand in February 1892. It was also included in the short story collection The Adventures of Sherlock Holmes published in October 1892.

Adaptations

Film and television
A silent short film based on the story was released in 1923 as part of the Stoll film series starring Eille Norwood as Sherlock Holmes.

Peter Cushing portrayed Sherlock Holmes in the 1968 BBC series. "The Adventure of Blue Carbuncle" is one of only six surviving episodes.

Algimantas Masiulis played Sherlock Holmes in a television film adaptation by Belarusfilm (1979).

In 1984 the story was the subject of an episode of the Granada TV version directed by David Carson and starring Jeremy Brett.

The animated television series Sherlock Holmes in the 22nd Century featured an adaptation of the story, replacing the goose with a blue stuffed toy called "Carbuncle" and the stone with a microprocessor.

Radio and audio dramas
Edith Meiser adapted "The Adventure of the Blue Carbuncle" as an episode of the radio series The Adventures of Sherlock Holmes. The episode aired on 28 December 1932 (with Richard Gordon as Sherlock Holmes and Leigh Lovell as Dr. Watson). Meiser also adapted the story for the radio series The New Adventures of Sherlock Holmes as an episode that aired on 4 January 1940 (with Basil Rathbone as Holmes and Nigel Bruce as Watson). Another episode adapted from the story aired on 25 December 1944 (again starring Rathbone and Bruce, and with Eric Snowden as Peterson). An adaptation written by Howard Merrill aired on 26 December 1948 (with John Stanley as Holmes and Wendell Holmes as Watson).

A radio dramatisation adapted by Felix Felton was broadcast on the BBC Home Service on 10 December 1952, as part of the 1952–1969 radio series starring Carleton Hobbs as Holmes and Norman Shelley as Watson. Other adaptations of the story in the same series aired on the BBC Home Service on 25 October 1957 and on the BBC Light Programme on 29 December 1961 (adapted by Michael Hardwick).

A 1954 BBC adaptation starred John Gielgud as Holmes and Ralph Richardson as Watson. The production first aired on the BBC Light Programme on 14 December 1954, and also aired on NBC radio on 13 March 1955.

An audio drama based on the story was released in 1970 on LP record, as one of several dramas starring Robert Hardy as Holmes and Nigel Stock as Watson. It was dramatised and produced by Michael Hardwick (who adapted the 1961 radio adaptation) and Mollie Hardwick.

"The Adventure of the Blue Carbuncle" was adapted as an episode of CBS Radio Mystery Theater featuring Kevin McCarthy as Sherlock Holmes and Court Benson as Dr. Watson. The episode first aired on 25 July 1977.

A radio production adapted by Bill Morrison aired on 23 July 1978, with Barry Foster as Holmes and David Buck as Watson, as one of 13 Holmes stories adapted for BBC Radio 4.

A BBC radio adaptation aired on 2 January 1991, as part of the 1989–1998 radio series starring Clive Merrison as Holmes and Michael Williams as Watson. The episode was adapted by Bert Coules, and featured Peter Blythe as James Ryder, Ben Onwukwe as John Horner, and Christopher Good as Peterson.

An episode of the radio series The Classic Adventures of Sherlock Holmes was adapted from the story. Starring John Patrick Lowrie as Holmes and Lawrence Albert as Watson, the episode aired on 28 December 2008.

See also
 List of Christmas-themed literature

References

Sources

External links 

 

1892 short stories
Christmas short stories
Blue Carbuncle, The Adventure of the
Short stories adapted into films
Works originally published in The Strand Magazine